The T-100 was a Soviet twin-turreted heavy tank prototype, designed in 1938–39 as a possible replacement for the T-35 heavy tank. The T-100 was designed by N. Barykov's OKMO design team at S.M. Kirov Factory No. 185 in Leningrad. The T-100 was originally conceived with three turrets and was eventually built with two. It was in competition with a similar design - the SMK - but neither were adopted and instead a single turret version of the SMK was ordered as the KV-1. All three prototypes were tested at the same time in the Battle of Summa during the Winter War with Finland.

Development
The project was initiated by the Red Army's need to replace the aging five-turreted T-35 tank based on combat experience in the Spanish Civil War. One of the lessons the Red Army drew from this conflict was the need for heavy 'shell-proof' armor on medium and heavy tanks. Although the T-35 was never used in Spain, its thin armor was vulnerable to the small towed antitank guns and gun-armed tanks encountered there by Soviet T-26 and BT tanks.

The T-100 was in direct competition against the very similar SMK heavy tank, by Lt-Colonel Josef Kotin's team at the Leningrad Kirovsky Factory. The original specification was for a five-turreted "anti-tank gun destroyer" which would resist 37–45 mm guns at any range and 76.2 mm artillery at 1,200 m.  Both design teams objected to the antiquated multi-turreted design and the requirement was reduced to two turrets before serious design work began.  Both tanks had some modern features, including thick, welded armor, radios and torsion bar suspension (another feature insisted upon by the design teams).

Description
The T-100 tank had two turrets one in front of the other requiring a long chassis. The front turret, mounting a 45 mm anti-tank gun had a limited area of fire due to the second turret behind. The second turret, mounting a 76.2 mm gun, was set taller on top of the superstructure than the first and so able to turn a full 360 degrees. The multi-turret concept - usually a mix of cannon and machine gun turrets - had been common in the 1920s, with the British one-off Vickers A1E1 Independent influencing the Soviet T-35.

Service history
The prototype T-100 tank was briefly tested alongside the other designs in the Soviet invasion of Finland in 1939 without success. It was never put into production, due to the archaic design concept, poor mobility and the availability of a far superior alternative, the KV series.

Variants

SU-100Y - In an attempt to rush a tank armed with a large howitzer capable of dealing with Finnish bunkers into use, one of the T-100s was converted into the SU-100Y self-propelled gun. It did not go into production, although the prototype was used in the defence of Moscow in 1941.

References 
 Zaloga, Steven J. and James Grandsen (1981). Soviet Heavy Tanks. London: Osprey Publishing. .
 Zaloga, Steven J. and James Grandsen (1984). Soviet Tanks and Combat Vehicles of World War Two. London: Arms and Armour Press. .
 Zaloga, Steven J. and Peter Sarson (1996). KV-1 & 2 Heavy Tanks 1939–1945.  Oxford: Osprey Publishing.  .

Interwar tanks of the Soviet Union
Multi-turreted tanks
Heavy tanks of the Soviet Union
Abandoned military projects of the Soviet Union
Trial and research tanks of the Soviet Union